Beat Bugs is an animated children's television series, created by Josh Wakely, and produced for Netflix by Grace: A Storytelling Company and Thunderbird Entertainment. The series is centered around five young anthropomorphised insects who live in an overgrown suburban backyard and learn life lessons while having adventures. Wakely acquired worldwide rights from Sony/ATV Music Publishing to a catalogue of music by the Beatles to feature in the series. The program features versions of songs by the popular rock group, performed by contemporary recording artists and interwoven into the narrative.

Series overview
{| class="wikitable" style="text-align:center;"
|-
! scope="col" style="padding:0 8px;" colspan="2" | Season
! scope="col" style="padding:0 8px;" | Episodes
! scope="col" style="padding:0 8px;" | Originally released
|-
| scope="row" style="width:15px; background:#89CFF0;"|
| [[Beat Bugs#Season 1 (2016)|1]]
| 13
| 
|-
| scope="row" style="width:15px; background:#FACC2E;"|
| [[Beat Bugs#Season 2 (2016)|2]]
| 13
| 
|-
| scope="row" style="width:15px; background: #FF5694;"|
| [[Beat Bugs#Special (2017)|Special]]
| 1
| 
|-
| scope="row" style="width:15px; background:#65E91E;”|
| [[Beat Bugs#Season 3 (2018)|3]]
| 13
| 
|}

Episodes

Season 1 (2016)

Season 2 (2016)

Special (2017)

Season 3 (2018)

References

Lists of Canadian children's animated television series episodes